La banda presidencial is a 2022 Peruvian satirical crime political comedy film written and directed by Eduardo Mendoza de Echave. Starring Emilram Cossio, Giovanni Ciccia, Andrés Salas, Haysen Percovich and Christian Ysla.

Synopsis 
Four forty-year-old friends, tired of their pathetic and routine existence, decide to change their lives from one day to the next by robbing the largest and most exclusive casino in Lima.

Cast 
The actors participating in this film are:

 Emilram Cossio
 Giovanni Ciccia
 Andrés Salas
 Haysen Percovich
 Christian Ysla
 Ebelin Ortiz
 Diego Bertie
 Katia Salazar
 Ximena Galiano

Release 
The film premiered on September 22, 2022, in Peruvian theaters.

References 

2022 films
2022 crime films
2022 comedy films
Peruvian political comedy films
Peruvian crime comedy films
La Soga Producciones films
2020s Peruvian films
2020s Spanish-language films
Films set in Peru
Films shot in Peru
Films about friendship
Films about robbery
Films about kidnapping

External links